Changhua County (Mandarin Pinyin: Zhānghuà Xiàn; Wade-Giles: Chang¹-hua⁴ Hsien⁴; Hokkien POJ: Chiang-hòa-koān or Chiong-hòa-koān) is the smallest county on the main island of Taiwan by area, and the fourth smallest in the country. With a total population of 1.24 million, Changhua County is the most populous county in the Republic of China. Its capital is Changhua City and it is part of the Taichung–Changhua metropolitan area.

History

Early history
There are 32 prehistoric burial sites in Changhua that date back 5000 years. The original name of the area was Poasoa, so-named by the local indigenous tribes. Poasoa used to be inhabited primarily by the Babuza people, who have since been mostly assimilated by the Han people.

Qing dynasty
Qing rule in Taiwan began in 1683, and in 1684, Taiwan Prefecture was established to administer Taiwan under Fujian Province. The prefecture consisted of three counties: ,  and Zhuluo. Poasoa and modern-day Changhua County were under the jurisdiction of Zhuluo, but the Changhua area was spread over three counties.

In 1723, after the Zhu Yigui rebellion, an inspector official in Taiwan requested to the Qing Emperor to designate Changhua to another county magistrate and legal warden because of the increasing population in the northern part of Zhuluo County. As a result, Changhua County was created, encompassing the area of modern Changhua County, Taichung, half of Yunlin County and three townships of Nantou County. Changhua County Hall was built in the middle of the district and is regarded as the beginning of the Changhua County establishment.

The name of Changhua, meaning "manifestation of a royal civilization", is formally worded "manifestation of the majestic Emperor's civilization spread over the seas".

Japanese rule
During early Japanese rule, the island was subdivided into three : Taihoku, Taiwan, and Tainan. Changhua was ruled under Taiwan Ken. In 1920, after several administrative changes, Taichū Prefecture was established, covering modern-day Changhua County, Nantou County and Taichung City. By 1930, the population in Changhua already exceeded one million.

After World War II
After the after World War II of Taiwan on 25 December 1945, the area of the current Changhua County was established under the jurisdiction of Taichung County. On 16 August 1950 after its separation from Taichung County, Changhua County was established with Changhua City as its county seat on 1 December 1951.

Geography
Changhua county is located on the west coast of Taiwan, bordering Taichung City on the north separated by Dadu River, so Changhua County and Taichung City are often referred to as the Taichung–Changhua metropolitan area. Changhua County is bordered by Yunlin County to the south by the Zhuoshui River. To the east, Changhua County is separated from Nantou County and southern Taichung City by Bagua Plateau. To the west, Changhua County faces the Taiwan Strait.

The landscape of Changhua can be roughly divided into two parts, one being the western flat land, and the other being the Changhua Plain. This two combines measures up to 88% of Changhua county's total area.

Administration

Changhua County is divided into 2 cities, 6 urban townships and 18 rural townships. Changhua City is the seat of the county which houses the Changhua County Government and Changhua County Council. Changhua County has the highest number of urban townships of all counties in Taiwan. It also has the second highest number of rural townships after Pingtung County. The current Magistrate of Changhua County is Wang Huei-mei of the Kuomintang.

Electoral politics
Changhua County, an electoral bellwether, is seen as a political battleground between the Kuomintang (KMT) and the Democratic Progressive Party (DPP). While it has historically favored the KMT, recent elections have swung in the direction of the DPP.

County Magistrate
The Changhua County Magistrate is the democratically elected chief executive officer of the county. The current incumbent is Wang Huei-Mei of the Kuomintang.

Legislative Yuan
Since the reorganization of the Legislative Yuan into a 113-member chamber in 2008, Changhua has been divided into four constituencies, each of which return one legislator. In 2011 the incumbent in Changhua 1, Chen Shou-ching, died in office. Because there was less than a year left on her term in office, the seat was left vacant until the 2012 election. In 2014 a by-election was held in Changhua 4 after Wei Ming-ku was elected as Changhua County Magistrate.

Culture

Changhua County in films
 You Are the Apple of My Eye

Economy

Lukang used to be the economic hub of central Taiwan in its early years where it was a commercially prosperous area. It was an important trading port during the Qing Dynasty.

Farming
Around 1,200 hectares of total land used for growing fruits in the county is used for grape cultivation with Xihu Township acts as the largest grape production hub in the county.

Education

 National Changhua University of Education
 Dayeh University
 MingDao University
 Chienkuo Technology University
 Chung Chou University of Science and Technology

Energy

Changhua County is home to Taiwan's two gas-fired power plants, Hsingyuan Power Plant and Hsingneng Power Plant, with a capacity of 490 MW each. Both power plants are located in Lukang Township.

With an installed capacity of 188.5 MW from 83 onshore wind turbine, Changhua County has the largest wind energy capacity of any county, municipality or city in Taiwan. As of 2015, there were 21 offshore wind farms located in the water offshore of the county.

Tourism

Changhua was one of the cultural centers of Taiwan, with a lot of ancient monuments and structures left from the Qing Dynasty, including the Confucian Temple, Tian Ho Gung, built in Lukang in 1647. There are currently 6 National Certified Historical Monuments, 42 County Certified Historical Monuments, 67 Historical Infrastructures, and 1 Cultural Center in Changhua County.

Museums
Museums in the county include the BRAND'S Health Museum, Changhua County Art Museum and Lukang Folk Arts Museum.

Art and culture centers
The county is home to the following art and culture centers, which are Changhua Arts Hall, Lukang Culture Center and National Changhua Living Art Center.

Temples
Temples in Changhua County are 
 Baozang Temple (芬園寶藏寺) : built in 1672 and dedicated to Guanyin Bodhisattva, designated as a third grade historic building
 Changhua Confucian Temple (彰化孔廟) : built in 1726 and renovated in 1830, is a Grade 1 national historical site
 Hushan Temple (虎山巖) : built in 1747 and dedicated to Guanyin Bodhisattva
 Kaihua Temple (彰化開化寺) : originally constructed in 1724 as Guanyin Shrine
 Lukang Longshan Temple (鹿港龍山寺) : first built in 1738, renowned for its exquisite woodcarvings, as well as for its stone sculptures, especially the 12 major support columns in the main hall, twined by auspicious dragons hewn from solid stone
 Lukang Wen Wu Temple (鹿港文武廟) : first built in 1806, consists of Martial Temple (武廟), Literature Shrine (文祠) and Wenkai Academy (文開書院)
 Nanyao Temple (彰化南瑤宮) : completed in 1738 and originally named Mazu Temple, designated as a third grade historic building
 Shetou Doushan Temple (社頭斗山祠) : built in 1880, ancestral temple of "Xiao" (蕭) clan
 Yuanching Temple (元清觀) : constructed in 1763, one of the earliest temple in Taiwan that is dedicated to Jade Emperor

Nature
Nature tourism in the county are Alice's Garden and Changhua Fitzroy Gardens.

Historical buildings
Historical buildings in the county are the Changhua Wude Hall, Daodong Tutorial Academy, Fuxing Barn, Lukang Ai Gate, Lukang Kinmen Hall, Lukang Rimao Hang, Luocuo Church, Spring of Youth, Yi Yuan Mansion and Yusan Hall.

Transportation

Rail
There are 8 stations in Changhua County of the Taiwan Railways Administration (TRA), with the largest being Changhua Station located in Changhua City. The rest are: Huatan Station, Dacun Station, Yuanlin Station, Yongjing Station, Shetou Station, Tianzhong Station and Ershui Station.

Taiwan High Speed Rail has also one station in the county, which is Changhua Station.

Road
National Highway 1 and National Highway 3 both pass through Changhua County. In addition, there are plenty of provincial highways as well. The Xiluo Bridge, with a span over 1,900 meters and opened in 1953, links Changhua County with neighboring Yunlin County.

Sports
Changhau has one professional basketball team, the Formosa Taishin Dreamers of the P. League+ (shared with Taichung).

Sister cities
  Nagano Prefecture, Japan (2008)

Relative location

Notable individuals
 Giddens Ko: Taiwanese novelist and filmmaker.

References

External links